Kinga Dekany is a Hungarian sprint canoer who has competed from the late 1990s to the mid-2000s. She won nine medals at the ICF Canoe Sprint World Championships with four golds (K-4 200 m: 1998, 2001; K-4 1000 m: 2001, 2003), three silvers (K-2 200 m: 1998, K-4 500 m: 1997, 1998), and two bronzes (K-2 500 m: 1998, 2001).

Awards
 Hungarian kayaker of the Year (1): 1998

References

Hungarian female canoeists
Living people
Year of birth missing (living people)
ICF Canoe Sprint World Championships medalists in kayak